Sacculectomy may refer to the removal of:

 Laryngeal saccules
 Anal glands